Mount Andromeda can refer to:
 Mount Andromeda (Alberta) in Canada
 Mount Andromeda (South Sandwich Islands) near the South Pole